The 2021 IIHF World Championship Division IV was scheduled to be an international ice hockey tournament run by the International Ice Hockey Federation.

The tournament would have been held in Bishkek, Kyrgyzstan from 3 to 5 March 2021.

On 18 November 2020, the tournament was cancelled due to the COVID-19 pandemic.

Malaysia, Philippines, Iran and Singapore were all scheduled to debut in the world championships.

Planned participants

Standings

References

2020
Division IV
March 2021 sports events in Asia
2021 in Kyrgyzstani sport
Sport in Bishkek
International ice hockey competitions hosted by Kyrgyzstan
Ice hockey events cancelled due to the COVID-19 pandemic